A demonstrator may be:
 A person performing a demonstration, such as to explain science or technology
 A person demonstrating a product for sale live or in an infomercial
 An attendee at a political rally
 An academic rank
 A vehicle adapted to emergency service specification, and issued to locations for use as a prospective emergency vehicle if adopted to that workforce either police, ambulance or fire.
 A fountain pen with a transparent body originally used so dealers could show customers how they worked. See Demonstrator pen
 Demonstrator (film)